Marianna Nagy may refer to:

Marianna Nagy (figure skater) (1929–2011), Hungarian pair skater
Marianna Nagy (handballer) (born 1957), Hungarian Olympic handball player
Marianna Nagy (speed skater) (born 1984), Hungarian Olympic speed skater